Terry Cahill (born 30 April 1958) is a former Australian rules footballer who played with Essendon in the Victorian Football League (VFL).		

Cahill was knocked unconscious in a clash with St Kilda's Carl Ditterich in 1978.  He retired soon after to become a school principal. 

He is the former Principal at Saint Agatha's Primary School in Cranbourne.

Notes

External links 

1958 births
Australian rules footballers from Victoria (Australia)
Essendon Football Club players
Living people
Australian headmasters